Kohinoor is a 2015 Indian Malayalam-language heist comedy film, set in the late 1980s. The film is directed by Vinay Govind and features Asif Ali and Indrajith Sukumaran in the lead role along with an ensemble cast of Aju Varghese, Chemban Vinod Jose, Vinay Forrt, Aparna Vinod and Shraddha Srinath. It was produced by Asif Ali in his debut film production which was co-produced by Sajin Jaffer and Brijeesh Muhammed under the banner Adam's World of Imagination. Rahul Raj composed the original music. It became a critical and commercial success.

The film released on 24 September 2015 to positive reviews. It released online through Reelmonk for audiences abroad a few weeks later.

Plot
The story is set in 1988. Haider (Indrajith) who worked for Mumbai underworld develops a plan to steal diamonds from a racket based in Kohinoor textile store in Cherupuzha run by Mamman (Sudheer Karamana) and Xavier (Riza Bava). He hires Nicholas (Chemban Vinod) and Freddy (Vinay Forrt) from Kochi for the theft. They in turn make sub-contract to a small-time thief Aandikunju (Aju Varghese), who gets his friend Louis (Asif Ali) involved to steal for the group. Louis as a 1980s characterized youth has admiration for the underworld dons and is highly fascinated by Mammootty's character Tharadas from the popular film Athirathram and Mohanlal's character Sagar Alias Jacky from the popular film Irupatham Noottandu, and wants to be a successful smuggler like them. The team runs into many obstacles during the thievery. In the end both Haider's team (Haider, Nicholas, Freddy and Nancy) and Louis' team (Louis and Andrew) takes a share of the diamonds, while risking life and a show of confidence.

Cast
 Asif Ali  as Louis
 Indrajith Sukumaran as Haider
 Aju Varghese as Andrew/Aandikkunju/Aandi
 Vinay Forrt as Freddy
 Chemban Vinod Jose as Nicholas
 Shraddha Srinath as Nancy
 Aditi Ravi as Freddy's Lover
 Aparna Vinod as Daisy
 Sudheer Karamana as Maman
 Riza Bava as Xavier
 Mamukkoya as Aaliyakka
Guru Somasundaram as Naikkar
 Pradeep Kottayam as Lilly's father(cameo appearance)
 Bhavana as Lilly (Cameo appearance)
 Saiju Kurup as DYSP Mohan Raghavan (Cameo appearance)
 Harikrishnan as Charlie (Cameo appearance)
 Nebish Benson

Critical reception
Malayala Manorama rated 2.75 out of 5 stars and concluded "Kohinoor is a fun-filled thriller and has all the elements of an entertainer, with a pinch of romance, friendship and wicked twists" and gave special mention to cinematography and lead performances especially for Indrajith's screen presence and dialogue delivery. Filmibeat.com rated 2.5 out of 5 stars and described as "A well-packed entertainer with the right elements of humour, thrill and nostalgia", giving special mention to Indrajith's performance, also cinematography, editing, art and costumes which helps to create the ambience of the 80s. Indiaglitz rated 3 out of 5 stars and wrote "It has a liner narration and what would stead the movie in good stead is the comic touch throughout. 'Kohinoor' has been able to make it till the far end and not flatter halfway".

The Hindu stated "The proceedings before interval, which focusses on the planning of the heist, are marked by aimlessness. Things pick up post-interval especially in the long sequence set inside the textile shop. The quick twists and turns come together in the end to make an average heist movie in the end".

Soundtrack

All songs are composed, arranged and produced by Rahul Raj. The lyrics were written by B. K. Harinarayanan. Muzik 247 was the music label. The audio launch event was held in Kochi on 8 September. Apart from the cast and crew, film personalities such as Mammootty, Sibi Malayil, Kunchacko Boban etc. were also present. Mammooty and Sibi Malayil together launched the audio by unveiling the CD. The songs were streamed live on Muzik247's YouTube channel at the event. The official launch of the production house Adams World of Imagination was held coinciding with the audio launch function. It was launched by Mammootty.

The melody Hemanthamen which was released on 5 August, received overwhelming response from critics and public alike. It garnered more than 100000 views within three days of release in YouTube and as of 6 December 2016, the song has reached to 3 million views. Actor Dulquer Salmaan officially released and shared the YouTube link of the song "Dum Dum Dum" on Facebook.

References

External links

2015 films
2010s Malayalam-language films
2015 crime films
Indian crime films
Indian heist films
Films set in the 1980s
Films set in 1988
Films shot in Thalassery
Films shot in Kannur
Films shot in Kochi
Films scored by Rahul Raj